John Chalmers (1825–1899) was a Scottish  Protestant missionary in China and translator.

Chalmers served with the London Missionary Society and during the late Qing Dynasty China. He wrote several works on the Chinese language, including, in 1866, the first translation into English of Lao Tzu's Tao Te Ching (which he called the Tau Teh King).

Works

References

Notes

External links
 

1825 births
1899 deaths
Scottish translators
Protestant missionaries in China
Protestant writers
19th-century British translators
Scottish Protestant missionaries
British expatriates in China
Missionary linguists